The Right of the Strongest may refer to:

 The Right of the Strongest (novel), 1913 novel by Frances Nimmo Greene
 The Right of the Strongest (film), 1924 American silent film based on the novel